Captain Fracasse (Italian:Capitan Fracassa) is a 1919 Italian silent historical film directed by Mario Caserini. It is based on the 1863 novel of the same name by Théophile Gautier.

Cast
In alphabetical order
 Ferruccio Biancini as Duca di Vallombrosa  
 Amedeo Ciaffi 
 Gemma De Ferrari as Agostina  
 Nini Dinelli as Chiquita  
 Mimi
 Roberto Spiombi as Leandro  
 Teresa Termini as Isabella 
 Ernesto Treves as Vallombrosa padre  
 Franco Zeni as Capitan Fracassa

References

Bibliography 
 Goble, Alan. The Complete Index to Literary Sources in Film. Walter de Gruyter, 1999.

External links 
 

1919 films
1910s historical films
Italian historical films
Italian silent feature films
1910s Italian-language films
Films directed by Mario Caserini
Films set in the 17th century
Italian black-and-white films
Films based on Captain Fracasse